Silk Purse is the second studio album by Linda Ronstadt, released in March 1970, a year after the release of her solo debut, Hand Sown ... Home Grown. It was recorded at Cinderella Sound Studio in Nashville – the only Ronstadt album recorded in the country music capital – and was produced by Elliot Mazer, who had previously worked with Richie Havens, Gordon Lightfoot, James Cotton, Rufus Thomas, Chubby Checker and Frank Sinatra. The track Long Long Time was recorded in Woodland Sound Studios in Nashville. Mazer was recommended to Linda by Janis Joplin, whom she knew from the local night clubs.

History
The album features songs in a traditional country music setting. Ronstadt later remarked that "Nashville Country is very different from California Country." This album, like its predecessor, was also different in style and sound from Ronstadt's previous Folk Rock work with the Stone Poneys.

Silk Purse includes interpretations of the Hank Williams song "Lovesick Blues" and Mel Tillis's "Mental Revenge," and a version of the traditional song "Life Is Like A Mountain Railway." The album also features a remake of "Will You Love Me Tomorrow?" – the Gerry Goffin-Carole King song recorded by The Shirelles in 1961 – and a harmony duet with Texan Gary White on the Paul Siebel ballad "Louise," later covered by Bonnie Raitt.

White's most significant contribution, however, was a ballad that Linda had to persuade her record company to include on the album – "Long, Long Time," which in due course proved to be the singer's first charting single as a solo artist. After it was recorded, and despite Ronstadt's obvious affection for the material, Capitol Records executives attempted to dissuade her from picking more songs like "Long, Long Time," which they considered too country. Nonetheless, her intensely passionate reading of the song made it a major hit, reaching No. 21 in Record World magazine, No. 25 on the Billboard Hot 100 singles chart, and No. 26 in Cash Box.  It earned Ronstadt her first Grammy nomination in early 1971.

Following the release of Silk Purse, Ronstadt formed a backing and touring band that she also used on her next, self-titled album. Her new group consisted of Glenn Frey, Bernie Leadon, Randy Meisner and Don Henley. The musicians synced so well on stage, they later formed The Eagles.

Reception

Three months after the album's release, Rolling Stone'''s Alec Dubro reviewed Silk Purse in the magazine's June 25 issue. "Some of the material is raw imitation and some is more original, but none is very far from the soul of the singer," Dubro wrote. "It is Linda Ronstadt's voice that makes this record; she endows the songs with a feeling that she has shown since the first Stone Poneys' album, and she has developed her Country style considerably since her last album." Lester Bangs  also reviewed the album in Penthouse, writing: "Linda Ronstadt's vocal style is like her physical presence: brimming with passion and vulnerability, tremulous, yet possessed of a core of absolute strength."

Music critic Robert Christgau commended Ronstadt for her choice of tunes but noted that "only occasionally – "Lovesick Blues" and "Long Long Time" are both brilliant – does she seem to find Kitty Wells's soul as well as her timbre."

Though released in March, Silk Purse did not debut on the Billboard Top 200 LP chart until October 1970, spending 10 weeks on the chart but peaking at a disappointing No. 103. This came on the heels of the late-summer performance of the "Long, Long Time" single,  which peaked at No. 25 in Billboard and No. 26 in Cash Box''. The single earned her a Grammy nomination in early 1971 for Best Contemporary Vocal Performance, Female, but lost to Dionne Warwick's "I'll Never Fall In Love Again.

Track listing

Personnel
Adam Mitchell - musical director
Kenny Buttrey - arrangements and conductor on "Lovesick Blues"
Elliot Mazer, Adam Mitchell - arrangements and conductors on "Are My Thoughts with You?" and "Will You Love Me Tomorrow?"
Norbert Putnam, Adam Mitchell - arrangements and conductors on "Nobody's"
Gary White - vocals on "Louise"
Norbert Putnam - arrangement and conductor on "Long Long Time"
The Beechwood Rangers - accompaniment on "Life Is Like a Mountain Railway"
Elliot Mazer, Fred Catero, Howard Gale, Lee Hazen, Wayne Moss - engineers

Charts

References

1970 albums
Linda Ronstadt albums
Albums produced by Elliot Mazer
Capitol Records albums